Morrison is a town in Warren County, Tennessee, United States. The population was 684 at the 2000 census and 694 at the 2010 census.

Geography
Morrison is located at  (35.604869, -85.915004).

Demographics

2020 census

As of the 2020 United States census, there were 733 people, 202 households, and 151 families residing in the town.

2000 census
As of the census of 2000, there were 684 people, 254 households, and 185 families residing in the town. The population density was 251.9 people per square mile (97.1/km2). There were 276 housing units at an average density of 101.6 per square mile (39.2/km2). The racial makeup of the town was 88.45% White, 9.65% African American, 0.15% Native American, 1.02% from other races, and 0.73% from two or more races. Hispanic or Latino of any race were 2.49% of the population.

There were 254 households, out of which 37.4% had children under the age of 18 living with them, 54.3% were married couples living together, 15.4% had a female householder with no husband present, and 26.8% were non-families. 22.8% of all households were made up of individuals, and 12.6% had someone living alone who was 65 years of age or older. The average household size was 2.62 and the average family size was 3.05.

In the town, the population was spread out, with 28.7% under the age of 18, 9.6% from 18 to 24, 27.9% from 25 to 44, 19.4% from 45 to 64, and 14.3% who were 65 years of age or older. The median age was 35 years. For every 100 females, there were 85.9 males. For every 100 females age 18 and over, there were 83.5 males.

The median income for a household in the town was $23,819, and the median income for a family was $31,250. Males had a median income of $28,125 versus $21,250 for females. The per capita income for the town was $13,105. About 20.6% of families and 23.9% of the population were below the poverty line, including 33.9% of those under age 18 and 9.2% of those age 65 or over.

Notable people
Robert Brown, cartoonist.
P. Allen Smith, gardening and lifestyle expert.

References

Towns in Tennessee
Towns in Warren County, Tennessee